Richmond School & Sixth Form College, often referred to simply as Richmond School, is a coeducational secondary school located in North Yorkshire, England. It was created by the merger of three schools, the oldest of which, Richmond Grammar School, is of such antiquity that its exact founding date is unknown. The first mentions of it in writings, however, is estimated, to be between 1361 and 1474. It was officially ratified as an educational establishment in 1568 by Elizabeth I.

The school is on the outskirts of Richmond, near the Yorkshire Dales. It accepts both boys and girls and serves a wide catchment area across most of the north-west corner of North Yorkshire, including Swaledale.

History

Richmond Grammar School
Richmond School was the first school in Richmondshire. It accepted only boys and its only entry requirements were that pupils could read and write. Its original founding date is not known, however it first appears in a registry estimated to have been written in 1361–1474. It was awarded a charter ratifying its status on 14 March 1568 by Queen Elizabeth I and was one of the first free grammar schools in England. The school was built on what is now the churchyard of St Mary's Church, which stands opposite to and further up the hill to the former Richmond Lower School Building. In 1677 a new building replaced the Elizabethan one and this was used until 1850 when the school moved into a smaller building which still stands, and until 2011 was used for teaching.

The name of the school from its foundation was Richmond School as it was the only school in the town for a long period of time. In later years it was referred to locally as "The Grammar School" although this was not its official name. Following the merger of the school with the Secondary Modern and the Girls' High School into a single comprehensive school the decision was made to retain the name 'Richmond School' for the new establishment.

Notable heads
 Rev. Anthony Temple (1724–1795). Temple succeeded in getting 29 of his pupils sent to Oxford and Cambridge.
 James Tate (1771–1843), Headmaster 1796–1833. Tate was even more successful; Richmond School become a nationally known school for classical learning. Tate sent up many scholars to Cambridge (they were known as "Tate’s Invincibles"). 21 became fellows, 13 of them at Trinity College.
 Thomas Henry Stokoe (1833–1903), Headmaster 1863–1871. Stokoe was a renowned clergyman and author.

Richmond Girls’ High School
In 1940 a Girls’ High school was built, designed by Modernist architect Denis Clarke Hall.

Richmond Secondary Modern School

In 1950 Richmond Secondary Modern School was built to accommodate those who had not passed their 11-plus exam and so did not qualify for admission to either Richmond School or the Girls' High School. Large buildings were constructed about 200 yards from the Girls’ High School.

Comprehensive school
In 1971 all three schools merged to create a comprehensive school named Richmond School. The then-headmaster of the Grammar School, J.D. Dutton, became the headmaster of the new combined school. All three original sites were still used but for different purposes. The school was split into three sections: Lower School for Year 7, Middle School for Years 8–10 and Upper School for Years 11–13. These were situated in the former Richmond (Grammar) School, the former Secondary Modern School and the Girls’ High School respectively, although significant extensions were added to all sites until the school’s investment as part of a DfES 'Building Schools for the Future' programme.

In January 2006 the school was successful in bidding for a DfES grant of £30 million to be spent redeveloping the school. A large factor that played a part in the grant was that Richmond is the only school in North Yorkshire to have sites which are 1 mile apart. In addition to the £30 million a successful bid was made to make the school sustainable. This brought the total investment to over £32 million. In 2009 it was announced that those entering the school in the academic year 2010–11 would be the last to use the original 1850 site (now called Lower School) in their first year in the school; all years would be taught at the same Darlington Road site and the Lower School would be sold off. The Lower School was later bought by North Yorkshire County Council in 2012 for £400,000 to be used as their new headquarters. 

In February 2014, the Governing body of the school resigned en masse in response to North Yorkshire Education Authority issuing the school with a Warning Notice under the Education and Inspections Act 2006. In the resignation statement, the Full Governing Body rejected the assertions in the Warning Notice as unevidenced and contrary to the opinions expressed in Ofsted's recent inspection report. The Local Authority confirmed that measures were underway to appoint an Interim Executive Board.

Academy
Previously a community school administered by North Yorkshire County Council, in December 2017 Richmond School converted to academy status. The school is now sponsored by the Areté Learning Trust.

School seal
In the Elizabethan Charter it was stated that Richmond Grammar School had the right to a "common seal for their businesses," and in 1566–67 a new seal for the school was introduced. The seal was still in existence in 1958.

In the centre of the seal was the figure of Saint James of Compostela. For several years Richmond Grammar School published an annual collection of poetry and prose writing by pupils in a small publication called "The Compostelian".

A description of the seal is found in L.P. Wenham's Book (page 27): "The Central figure is that of St. James the Greater in pilgrim's garb. His feet are bare, he has a bushy beard, wears a long, loose dress, has an escallop shell on his broad-brimmed hat, a strip or wallet hangs at his side from his girdle, his left hand holds a rosary and a small barrel or gourd, while in his right hand he carries a palmer's staff. At each side of him, upon Gothic shaped shields are the arms of France (new) and England quarterly; in the field are three lilies of France and two leopards of England."

The legend around the edge of the seal reads in Renaissance capitals:

SIGILLVM COMVNE translates as "the common seal", DE RICHMOND means "of Richmond", while LIBRE SCOLE BVRGENSIVM means "of the independent [free] school of the town".

The whole legend, in Elizabethan Latin, means in English "The common seal of the independent school of the town of Richmond".

Uniform

School uniform consists of black trousers or a skirt, a white shirt a school tie and a navy blue school jumper or black blazer with the school seal embroidered in colour. The legend on the uniform's seal is not the original Latin, but instead is simply  'Richmond School Yorkshire'. The previous school tie was of navy blue, gold and burgundy School colours. Until 1971 when the schools merged the tie incorporated a coloured stripe to signify the 'house' of the pupil. Green for Tate, yellow for Zetland, red for Gower and blue for Friary. The latter house was composed solely of boarding pupils from the Friary. From 2010 ties became of block colour dependent on the academic year of pupils.

Sport

The school has a strong tradition of sport. Until 2003 male students at the Lower School had to perform a 1-mile run to and from playing fields at Easby. They also played rugby at Theakston Lane, now the ground of Richmond RFC. Nowadays, the school has several playing fields and pitches at its Darlington Road site. These include cricket pitches, several full-size football and rugby pitches, an all-weather AstroTurf pitch and a large grass athletics track which is locally known as "Wembley" as its dimensions are so close to those of the famous stadium. As part of the redevelopment of the school a large sports hall and gym were also constructed. The school allows the local community sports programmes to use its facilities out of term time and multiple training sessions take place at the site.

The school offers primarily a choice of rugby or football to boys and hockey and netball to girls as part of their compulsory education. However, the school offers multiple extra-curricular clubs and teams including athletics, golf, trampolining and cheerleading among others.

Sporting teams are popular including a mixed hockey team which won the national title in 2008. Rugby and football are also popular with various wins.

Headmasters

Richmond Grammar School
1392–1393 Stephen Moys
1397–? Richard Forister
1436/7–? John Gardiner
1545–1548 John More
1577–? John Clarkson (Trinity College, Cambridge)
1608–1612 Richard Bland
1612–1613 Thomas Thompson
1613–1617 William Lambert (St John's College, Cambridge)
1617–1618 Sander (or Alexander) Hutton
1618–1620 John Jackson (Christ's College, Cambridge)
1620–1629 John Bathurst
1629–1630/1 Samuel Picarde (St John's College, Cambridge)
1630/1–1639 John Beckwith
1639–1648 John Bathurst
1648–1696 John Parvinge (Sidney Sussex College, Cambridge)
1696–1722 William Thompson
1722–1750 Robert Close (St John's College, Cambridge)
1750–1795 Anthony Temple (Sidney Sussex College, Cambridge)
1796–1833 James Tate I (Sidney Sussex College, Cambridge)
1833–1863 James Tate II (Trinity College, Cambridge)
1863–1871 Thomas Henry Stokoe (Lincoln College, Oxford)
1871–1884 James Snowden (St John's College, Cambridge)
1884–1890 Jean Rougier Cobu (Jesus College, Oxford)
1890–1895 Alfred Edward Rubie (Brasenose College, Oxford)
1895–1903 Douglas Rucker Smith (Queen's College, Oxford)
1903–1906 John Monteith Furness (King's College, Cambridge)
1906–1913 Algernon Richard Prestwich (Selwyn College, Cambridge)
1913–1919 Hago Sharpley (Corpus Christi College, Oxford)
1919–-1928 Thomas Charles Martin (Birkbeck, London)
1928–1950 Frank Charles Thackeray Woodhead (Hertford College, Oxford)
1950–1953 Thomas Gordon Charles Woodford (St Edmund Hall, Oxford)
1954–1959 Donald Alfred Frith (Christ's College, Cambridge)
1959–1962 Robert Dacres Baynes (Trinity College, Cambridge)

Richmond School
1962–1991 J. Derek Dutton
1991–1992 J. A. Lynch
1992–2002 Jim Jack
2002–2009 Phil Beever
2010–2017 Ian Robertson
2018– Jenna Potter

Notable former pupils

Richmond Grammar School

 Michael Blackburn, British poet
 Thomas Chapman, Master of Magdalen College, Oxford
 William Wyatt Dimond, actor
 Charles Grey, 2nd Earl Grey, British Prime Minister
 Marcus Gervais Beresford (1801–1885), Archbishop of Armagh
 Lewis Carroll (Charles Lutwidge Dodgson) (1844–46), writer
 Thomas Harrison, architect
 Cherie Lunghi, actress

Richmond Girls’ High School
 Brenda Hale, Baroness Hale of Richmond, DBE, QC, PC, FBA (Hon) (Born 1945), Justice of the Supreme Court of the United Kingdom

Richmond School

 Miles Owen, Television Actor notable for appearing in the programme "Our Yorkshire Farm".
 Amanda Sonia Berry, CEO of BAFTA
 Fran Summers, British model
 Theo Hutchcraft (1997–2002), half of the synthpop duo Hurts
 Joanne Jackson (1997–2002), British Olympic swimmer
 Nicola Jackson, British Olympic swimmer
 Calum Clark (2000–2005), England U-20 international rugby player
 Simon Farnaby, Actor, writer, and comedian
 Alison Mowbray, British Olympic silver medal winner in quadruple scull (Athens 2004)
 Joshua Coburn, professional footballer

References

Literature

External links
BBC School Profile
DirectGov School Profile
Richmond Building Preservation Trust – The Old Grammar School Appeal

Educational institutions established in the 1560s
Secondary schools in North Yorkshire
Richmond, North Yorkshire
1568 establishments in England
Academies in North Yorkshire